In anatomy, eminence implies a protuberance, and may refer to a variety of structures:

Collateral eminence, alongside the hippocampus in the brain
Cruciform eminence, in the occipital bone of the skull
Frontal eminence, on the frontal bone of the skull
Hypothenar eminence,  a group of three palmar muscles that control the pinky finger
Iliopubic eminence, in the pelvis
Intercondylar eminence, in the tibia bone of the leg
Medial eminence, in the rhomboid fossa of the fourth ventricle of the brain
Median eminence, below the hypothalamus of the brain
Müllerian eminence, in the cloaca of an embryo
Parietal eminence, in the parietal bone of the skull
Pyramidal eminence, in the middle ear
Thenar eminence, muscle on the thumb side of the hand

Musculoskeletal system